Drypis spinosa is a flowering plant species in the family Caryophyllaceae

References

Caryophyllaceae
Plants described in 1753
Taxa named by Carl Linnaeus